Terence Patrick McCulley (born 1957) is the former United States Ambassador to The Ivory Coast and a retired member of the Senior Foreign Service, with the rank of Minister-Counselor. McCulley was nominated by President Barack Obama to this post on June 26, 2013,  and presented his credentials to Ivorian President Alassane Ouattara on November 21, 2013. He is currently the Senior Director of the Africa practice at McLarty Associates and the Chairman of the U.S.-Nigeria Council.

Previously, McCulley was Ambassador to Nigeria from 2010 to 2013. Before that, he was Deputy Chief of Mission at the U.S. Embassy in Copenhagen, Denmark from 2008-2010 and served as U.S. Ambassador to the Republic of Mali from 2005-2008.  From 2004-2005, he worked at the State Department in Washington, helping to coordinate reconstruction efforts in Iraq.  He has been the Deputy Chief of Mission at the U.S. Embassies in Togo, Senegal, and Tunisia and also served as Consul in Mumbai, India.

Joining the Foreign Service in 1985, McCulley started his career in Niger, followed by assignments in South Africa and Chad.  Returning to Washington in 1993, he worked for two years on Central African affairs.  According to the State Department, McCulley is the recipient of four Department of State Superior Honor Awards.

Ambassador McCulley was born in Medford, Oregon, and grew up in Eugene, where he graduated with a Bachelor of Arts degree in European History and French Language and Literature from the University of Oregon.  As a Rotary Foundation Graduate Fellow, he studied political science at the Université de Haute Bretagne in Rennes, France.  In addition, he attended the Fletcher School of Law and Diplomacy.  McCulley is fluent in French.

Married to Renée McCulley, the couple have two sons.

References

External links 
 Côte d'Ivoire Embassy Biography
 

|-

|-

1957 births
Ambassadors of the United States to Mali
Ambassadors of the United States to Nigeria
Living people
People from Eugene, Oregon
People from Medford, Oregon
University of Oregon alumni
Ambassadors of the United States to Ivory Coast
United States Foreign Service personnel
21st-century American diplomats